{{Infobox settlement

| name                            = Zamfara جهار زمفر  
| official_name                   = 
| type                            = State
| image_skyline                   = IMG FK1.jpg
| image_alt                       = 
| image_caption                   = 
| image_flag                      = Zamfara State Flag.svg
| flag_alt                        = Flag of Zamfara State 
| flag_size                       = 120px
| image_seal                      = File:Seal of Zamfara State Government.jpg
| seal_alt                        = Seal of Zamfara State
| nickname                        = Farming is Our Pride
| image_map                       = Nigeria Zamfara State map.png
| map_alt                         = 
| map_caption                     = Location of Zamfara State in Nigeria
| coordinates                     = 
| coor_pinpoint                   = 
| coordinates_footnotes           = 
| subdivision_type                = Country
| subdivision_name                = 
| established_title               = Date created
| established_date                = 1 October 1996
| seat_type                       = Capital
| seat                            = Gusau
| government_footnotes            = 
| governing_body                  = Government of Zamfara State
| leader_title                    = Governor  (List)
| leader_name                     = Bello Mohammed Matawalle (APC)
| leader_title1                   = Deputy Governor
| leader_name1                    = Hassan Muhammed Gusau (APC)
| leader_title2                   = Legislature
| leader_name2                    = Zamfara State House of Assembly
| leader_title3                   = Senators
| leader_name3                    = 
| leader_title4                   = Representatives
| leader_name4                    = List
| unit_pref                       = Metric
| area_footnotes                  = 
| area_total_km2                  = 39,762
| area_rank                       = 7th of 36
| area_note                       = 
| elevation_footnotes             = 
| elevation_m                     = 
| population_footnotes            = 
| population_total                = 9,278,873
| population_as_of                = 2021 Census
| population_est                  = 9,838,160
| pop_est_as_of                   = 2011
| population_rank                 = 11th of 36
| population_density_km2          = auto
| population_note                 = 
| population_demonym              = Zamfaran
| demographics_type1              = GDP (PPP)
| demographics1_footnotes         = 
| demographics1_title1            = Year
| demographics1_info1             = 2007
| demographics1_title2            = Total
| demographics1_info2             = $4.12 billion
| demographics1_title3            = Per capita
| demographics1_info3             = $1,237
| timezone1                       = WAT
| utc_offset1                     = +01
| postal_code_type                = 
| postal_code                     = 
| area_code_type                  = 
| area_code                       = 
| iso_code                        = NG-ZA
| blank_name_sec1                 = HDI (2018)
| blank_info_sec1                 = 0.415 · 32nd of 37
| website                         = 
| footnotes                       = 
| image_shield                    = 
}}Zamfara''' (Hausa: Jihar Zamfara Fula: Leydi Zamfara 𞤤𞤫𞤴𞤣𞤭 𞤶𞤢𞤥𞤬𞤢𞤪𞤢) is a state in northwestern Nigeria. The capital of Zamfara state is Gusau and its current Governor is Bello Matawalle. Until 1996, the area was part of Sokoto State.

Zamfara is a densely populated area with the Hausa and Fulani peoples. The Zamfarawa mainly in Anka, Gummi, Bukkuyum and Talata Mafara Local Governments areas. Gobirawa populated Shinkafi Local Government. Gobirawa actually migrated from the Gobir Kingdom. Burmawa are found in Bakura and Fulani peopled Bungudu, Maradun, Gusau and are scattered all over the State. In Chafe, Bungudu and Maru, most are mainly Katsinawa, Garewatawa and Hadejawa. While, Alibawa people are located at Kaura Namoda and Zurmi, the Alawan Shehu Usmanu Fulani's are found in Birninmagaji.

It is bordered to the north by the Republic of the Niger, to the south by Kaduna State, to the east by Katsina State, and to the west by the states of Sokoto, Kebbi and Niger. It has a population of 9,278,873 according to the 2006 census and contains fourteen local government areas.

History
The people of Zamfara have over the years struggled for autonomy, but it was not until 1996 that the then military administration of the late General Sani Abacha detached the Zamfara State from Sokoto State with an area of 38,418 square kilometres. The first Governor was Jibril Yakubu.

The area today called Zamfara state was one of the old states like Kano, Katsina, Gobir, Kabi and Zazzau. The earliest inhabitants of Zamfara were said to have been hunters and giants. They established their first settlement at Dutsi, which was the first capital of Zamfara. It extends up to the bend of River Rima to the north west and River Ka in the south west. Zamfara Kingdom was established in the 11th century and flourished up to 16th century as a city-state. Its capital has shifted with the fortunes of the kingdom from place to place like Dutsi and Birnin Zamfara.

In the first half of the 18th century, its then capital Birnin Zamfara, was destroyed by the Gobir Kingdom and a new capital was established in Anka by the second half of the 19th century. Zamfara had many centres of commerce and scholarship that attracted many scholars like the Yandoto city. It became part of the Sokoto Caliphate after the 1804 jihad by Usman dan Fodio. In fact, Usman Danfodiyo settled in Sabon Gari where Sarkin Zamfara Abarshi had already established a garrison headquarters during the early days of his Jihad as a base from where fought Gobir and Kabi.

At the wake of British colonialism, the emerging town of Gusau became an important commercial and administrative centre with road and rail networks passing through it. With the creation of states during the Gowon Administration, Zamfara Kingdom became part of the then North West state and later the Sokoto State.

Climate
Rainy season starts in late May to September while the mild season known as Harmattan lasts from December to April. The hottest months in Zamfara are March and April that is just before the first rains. the onset of the rains bring a cooling effect with temperature dropping.

Local Government Areas

Zamfara State consists of fourteen (14) Local Government Areas. They are:

Demographics

Zamfara State is mainly populated by Hausa and Fulani people, with some members of Gwari, Kamuku, Kambari, Dukawa, Bissa (Bussawa and Zabarma ethnic communities. Others include the Igbo, Yoruba, Kanuri, Nupe and Tiv.

The state capital is an important commercial centre with a heterogeneous population of people from all over Nigeria. As in all major towns in Nigeria, all the major towns in Zamfara have a large population of other peoples from different parts of Nigeria.

Languages
Hausa is the official language of the state. Other main languages spoken in Zamfara are English, French, Fulfulde, Arabic; minority populations also speak languages like: Yoruba and Igbo.

The Kainji languages C'Lela and Gwamhi-Wuri are spoken in Gummi LGA. Ut-Ma'in is also spoken in the state and in Kebbe, Sokoto State and in Fakai, Kebbi State.

Economy

Agriculture and gold mining are the state's main occupations and the central source of income. Irrigation is required for cereals and legumes, hence the slogan "farming is our pride".

Over 80 percent of the population is engaged in agriculture. Major products include millet, guinea corn, maize, rice, groundnut, cotton, tobacco and beans. The State is known as farming is our pride because Agriculture provides foodstuff, raw materials and employment opportunities to young people in the State.

Natural resources 
Zamfara state has many natural resources, some are:

 Iron ore
 Gold
 Chromate
 Granite
 Clay
 Limestone
 chamovita
 Quartz
 Kaolin

Education 
tertiary institutions in Zamfara state include:

Federal Polytechnic, Kaura-Namoda
Federal University Gusau
Zamfara State College Of Education, Maru
Zamfara State University

Healthcares 
Zamfara state has many healthcare centres and hospitals, some of them are:

 Arewa hospital
 Daula hospital and maternity home
 Farida general hospital
 Rama hospital
 Gusau medical clinic
 Nasiha clinic
 Federal medical centre Gusau

Incidents

In 2009, gold mining became a greater source of income in Zamfara State as worldwide gold prices rose dramatically. High concentrations of lead in the ore from which gold was being extracted led to a lead poisoning outbreak in the state, requiring national and international intervention to remediate affected areas and provide medical care to children with severe lead poisoning.

Bandit attacks

Zamfara is known to experience several recent attacks from bandits. Some among them are:

On 26 February 2021, 279 girls were abducted from their boarding school located in Jangebe, Zamfara during the Zamfara kidnapping. They have since been released.

On 11–12 June 2021, motorcycle-riding bandits killed over 53 villagers, mostly farmers.

On 4–6 January 2022, over 200 people were killed by bandits in Zamfara State.

Religion

Islam is the principal and major religion of the state. Christianity also has many adherents. The original native religions also remain but they have the fewest followers. These religions are mainly practiced in ancient settlements like Dutsi and Kwatarkwashi. Zamfara was the first state in Nigeria to introduce Sharia law during the tenure of Ahmad Sani Yerima, the former Governor of the state.

Tourism

Zamfara State holds some number of tourist attractions which are of historical or religious importance. These include Jata, an ancient settlement of Zamfara located around the hill with a large cave around where traditional practices were performed.

Notable people

 Aishatu Madawaki
 Bello Matawalle
 Abdul'aziz Abubakar Yari
 Ahmad Sani Yerima
 Kabir Garba
 Tijjani Yahya Kaura
 Mahmud Shinkafi

Politics
The state government is led by a democratically elected governor who works closely with members of the state's house of assembly. The capital city of the state is Gusau.

See also
States of Nigeria

References

External links
 Official website of Zamfara State
 Nigerian Post Office- with map of LGAs of the state

 
States of Nigeria
States and territories established in 1996
1996 establishments in Nigeria